Manuel Cornu is a French sport climber. He participated at the 2016 and 2021 IFSC Climbing World Championships, being awarded two bronze medals and a silver medal in the men's bouldering and men's combined events.

See also
List of grade milestones in rock climbing
History of rock climbing
Rankings of most career IFSC gold medals

References

External links 

Living people
Place of birth missing (living people)
Year of birth missing (living people)
French rock climbers
IFSC Climbing World Championships medalists
21st-century French people
Boulder climbers